Nurmoo: Shout from the Plain is a 2009 Finnish film directed by Harri J. Rantala and starring Eerik Kantokoski, Anna Alkiomaa, Oskari Katajisto and Kalevi Haapoja.

Plot
Summer 1939 Little village Nurmo at the Finnish countryside is planning an international wrestling match that versus the whole world. But as autumn 1939 comes everything changes and the story forms into a legend. The time to tell it has now come.

Cast
 Eerik Kantokoski as Erkki 
 Anna Alkiomaa as Anna 
 Oskari Katajisto as Coach 
 Kalevi Haapoja as Tradesman 
 Juha Koistinen as Paavo 
 Karri Liikkanen as Heinis 
 Hannu Rantala as Kloppi 
 Arto Honkala as Jaakko 
 Saara Saastamoinen as Miina 
 Reeta Annala as Enni
 Laura Rämä as Maria
 Janna Haavisto as Laina
 Kauko Salo as Father
 Panu Mikkola as Goljat

Festivals 
Nurmoo: Shout from the Plain have been screened round the world in 33 festivals in 18 countries.

62nd Cannes Film Festival, France 2009 (Short Film Corner)
17th St. Petersburg International Film Festival, Russia 2009 (Official Competition)
8th Dokufest International Film Festival, Prizren Kosovo 2009 (Official Competition)
5th Budapest Short Film Festival, Budapest Hungary 2009 (Official Competition)
22nd Helsinki International Film Festival, Helsinki Finland 2009 (Official Selection)
12th Auburn International Film Festival, Sydney Australia 2009 (Official Competition)
17th Santiago International Film Festival, Santiago Chile 2009 (Official Competition)
3rd L´Aquila International Film Festival, L´Aquila Italy 2009 (Official Competition) 
11th Madurai International Film Festival, Madurai India 2009 (Official Competition)
11th Dhaka International Film Festival, Dhaka Bangladesh 2010 (Official Competition)
33rd Grenzland-Filmtage Film Festival, Selb Germany 2010 (Official Competition)
62nd Montecatini International Film Festival, Montecatini Italy 2011 (Official Competition)

See also
 2009 in film
 Cinema of Finland
 List of Finnish films: 2000s

References

External links
 

Films directed by Harri J. Rantala
Finnish drama films
2000s Finnish-language films
2009 films
Finnish short films